James Brown (c. 1864 – December 20, 1936) was a justice of the South Dakota Supreme Court from 1927 to 1930.

Born in Crosshouse, Ayrshire, Scotland, Brown came to the United States in 1880 and received his law degree from the University of Iowa College of Law before moving to Chamberlain, South Dakota, in 1888. Brown practiced law in Chamberlain until November 1927, when was appointed to the court by Governor William J. Bulow following the death of Justice John H. Gates. Brown unsuccessfully sought reelection to the seat in 1930, losing to Frederick A. Warren. He thereafter served as an assistant attorney general of South Dakota from February 1931 to April 1936.

Brown died in Pierre, South Dakota at the age of 76.

References

1864 births
1936 deaths
People from East Ayrshire
University of Iowa College of Law alumni
Justices of the South Dakota Supreme Court